Austin L. Theriault (born January 23, 1994) is an American professional stock car racing driver and politician, who currently works in driver development. He last competed part-time in the NASCAR Cup Series, driving the No. 52 for Rick Ware Racing, and part-time in the NASCAR Gander Outdoors Truck Series, driving the No. 92 Ford F-150 for RBR Enterprises. He won the ARCA Racing Series championship in 2017, driving for Ken Schrader Racing. He is the Representative of the 1st district of the Maine House of Representatives.

Racing career

Early career
A native of Fort Kent, Maine, he made his racing debut at the age of 13 in 2007 at Spud Speedway in Caribou, Maine Driving in the local racing divisions before moving up part-time to the touring late model division in 2009 where he qualified for his first American Canadian Tour race at Oxford Plains Speedway.

Theriault joined the ACT Late Model Tour full-time in 2010, finishing seventh in points driving the family-owned #57ME with a best finish of second. He started the 2011 season in a second car for RPM Motorsports, but returned to the family team mid-season, scoring eight top-ten finishes en route to third place in points. In 2012, Theriault finished no worse than ninth all year, scoring eight top-five runs and earning his first career ACT win at Beech Ridge Motor Speedway en route to another third-place points finish.

Theriault started his first Pro All-Stars Series (PASS) Super Late Model Touring Series event in 2010. He became a development driver for Brad Keselowski Racing during the 2012 season, and switched focus to Super Late Models following the ACT season, making selected starts throughout the Southeast for BKR while running part-time in the PASS North Tour in 2013 and 2014. Theriault won four PASS races between 2012 and 2014.

Theriault occasionally competed in other racing events and divisions from 2011 to 2014, including the ARCA Midwest Tour, World Series of Asphalt Stock Car Racing, CARS X-1R Pro Cup Series, Parts for Trucks Pro Stock Tour, Sunoco Gulf Coast Championship Series, CRA JEGS All-Star Tour, CRA Super Series Southern Division, CRA Super Series, ACT and the NASCAR K&N Pro Series East.

On July 20, 2013, Theriault competed in the prestigious IWK 250, along with car owner Brad Keselowski, in the No. 29X for BKR. After starting the race in 4th, Theriault had a clean race and brought the car home in an impressive 5th place, just two spots behind Keselowski who finished 3rd.

Theriault has competed five times in the Oxford 250, finishing in the top five in his first four starts with a best finish of second in 2014.

Xfinity Series
On May 18, 2014, Theriault made his NASCAR Nationwide Series debut at Iowa Speedway, driving the No. 5 Chevrolet Camaro for JR Motorsports where he finished 15th. On June 13 of that year, he won his first ARCA race, in Theriault's first start at Michigan International Speedway.

Theriault returned in the Xfinity Series, by practicing in the No. 22 Ford Mustang for Brad Keselowski at Iowa. Theriault later was picked up by Obaika Racing to drive the No. 77 Chevrolet Camaro, starting at Richmond.

Gander Outdoors Truck Series
In 2015, Theriault began racing part-time with Brad Keselowski Racing, driving the No. 29 Ford F-150. He is sharing the ride with Brad Keselowski, Joey Logano, and Ryan Blaney. He got his career-best finish at Daytona International Speedway in February where he finished 4th. He almost won at New Hampshire Motor Speedway, Theriault's home track where he led late in the race before fading to 8th.

On October 3, 2015, Theriault was involved in a huge crash at Las Vegas Motor Speedway when his BKR teammate Tyler Reddick got loose in turn 4 and clipped him, causing the race truck he was driving to hit nearly head on into the front stretch wall where there were no SAFER barriers installed. Theriault's steering wheel collided with and destroyed his helmet, and he eventually suffered a compression fracture in his lower back as a result of the crash. After missing the next four races, Theriault returned to racing at Homestead-Miami Speedway, finishing 12th. In 2016, he returned to BKR at Daytona, driving the No. 2.

On September 10, 2018, it was announced that Theriault returned to the Truck Series, driving the No. 30 Toyota Tundra for On Point Motorsports at Las Vegas. He finished in 8th place after avoiding multiple crashes.

On February 4, 2019, it was announced that Theriault would drive at least five races for RBR Enterprises, starting at Daytona.
Other tracks will include Martinsville Speedway (two races), Charlotte Motor Speedway, and Bristol Motor Speedway. The team failed to qualify at Daytona in their first attempt.

ARCA Racing Series

On February 18, 2017, Theriault won his second ARCA race in the season opener at Daytona International Speedway. The race was shortened by five laps after a red-flag was brought out for Justin Fontaine's flip, while rain forced ARCA officials to call the race. In late August, he won at Road America after sorting through two last-lap incidents. He also won the following race at DuQuoin after taking advantage of a late restart, and won the three-peat at Salem driving a Jack Bowsher throwback car. On September 22, 2017, Theriault won at Kentucky Speedway and mathematically clinched the ARCA Racing Series championship for 2017. He won the championship on the strength of seven wins.

NASCAR Cup Series
On June 29, 2019, it was announced that Theriault would make his Monster Energy NASCAR Cup Series debut at New Hampshire Motor Speedway in July, driving the No. 52 for Rick Ware Racing. After qualifying 36th, he finished 35th in the Foxwoods Resort Casino 301 upon retiring with a rear end issue on lap 185. The following week, he stayed with RWR for the Gander RV 400 at Pocono Raceway.

Driver development 
Theriault has not raced in any major series since 2019. He now owns a driver development business where he teaches aspiring drivers to become better racers.

Motorsports career results

NASCAR
(key)
(Bold – Pole position awarded by qualifying time. Italics – Pole position earned by points standings or practice time. * – Most laps led.)

Monster Energy Cup Series

Xfinity Series

Gander Outdoors Truck Series

K&N Pro Series East

ARCA Racing Series
(key) (Bold – Pole position awarded by qualifying time. Italics – Pole position earned by points standings or practice time. * – Most laps led.)

 Season still in progress
 Ineligible for series points

Political career 
In March 2022 Theriault ran for state legislature in Maine as a Republican in the 1st state house district. He would go to win an uncontested Republican primary and was later elected with 71% of the vote.  He assumed office on December 7, 2022.

References

External links

1994 births
Living people
People from Fort Kent, Maine
NASCAR drivers
ARCA Menards Series drivers
Racing drivers from Maine
ARCA Midwest Tour drivers
JR Motorsports drivers
Maine Republicans
21st-century American politicians